Broderick Lee Thomas (born February 20, 1967) is a former American football linebacker who played in the National Football League (NFL) for the Tampa Bay Buccaneers, the Detroit Lions, the Minnesota Vikings, and the Dallas Cowboys. He played college football for the University of Nebraska.

Early years 
Thomas was born in Houston, Texas. He graduated from Madison High School in Houston in 1985. He played as a defensive end. As a senior, he received All-American, All-state and Area defensive player-of-the-year (by the Houston Post) honors.

College career 
Thomas accepted a football scholarship from the University of Nebraska. Although he had never played linebacker before, he was converted into an outside linebacker, which was one of his conditions for coming to Nebraska.

He played eight games as a true freshman, registering 13 tackles (8 solo) and 2 sacks. The next year, he became a starter and was a part of the second nationally ranked defense, recording 58 tackles (third on the team), 4 sacks, a single-season record of 6 fumble recoveries and a single-game record of 3 sacks against  Colorado.

As a junior, he played at linebacker and defensive end, collecting 73 tackles, 6.5 sacks (fifth in the Big Eight), 3 passes defensed, 2 forced fumbles, 2 fumble recoveries and one interception. 

As a senior, he registered 98 tackles, 10 sacks, 35 quarterback pressures, 6 passes defensed, while helping his team win the Big Eight championship and earn an Orange Bowl invitation for the first time in five years. He called himself "Sandman", because he "put running backs to sleep".

He is considered to be one of the greatest defensive players in the history of Nebraska football and was also named to the Nebraska All-Century team.

Professional career

Tampa Bay Buccaneers
Thomas was selected by the Tampa Bay Buccaneers in the first round (sixth overall) of the 1989 NFL Draft. He was projected as an outside linebacker or defensive end, but the team decided to play him at middle linebacker in a 4-3 defense as a rookie, which caused him problems learning the system. He was a backup player, making 27 tackles, 2 sacks and one forced fumble.

In 1990, he was named the starter at outside linebacker, posting 72 tackles, 7.5 sacks (led the team) and 33 quarterback pressures (led the team). Against the Dallas Cowboys, he tied a club record with 3 sacks, including 2 on consecutive plays.

His best season came in 1991, after being shot in the upper chest and right arm during the offseason. He finished with 174 tackles (tied franchise record), 11 sacks (led the team), 22 quarterback pressures (second on the team), 10 tackles for loss (led the team), 7 forced fumbles (tied franchise record), 2 fumble recoveries and received Pro Bowl consideration. Against the Philadelphia Eagles, he set a club record with 21 tackles, while also making one sack and 3 tackles for loss. He earned NFC Defensive Player of the Week honors after collecting 11 tackles, 2 sacks, 3 passes defended and 2 fumble recoveries against the Detroit Lions.

In 1992, he reported out of shape for training camp and struggled with his pass coverage responsibilities as an outside linebacker in the team's new 3-4 defense. He tallied 113 tackles (third on the team), 5 sacks (tied for second on the team), 8 tackles for loss (second on the team), 3 fumble recoveries (led the team) and 8 passes defensed.

In 1993, he registered 75 tackles (fourth on the team), one sack and 8 quarterback pressures (third on the team). His playing time was reduced to 8 starts, while platooning with Jimmy Williams, starting at right linebacker against the Giants and at left linebacker in seven-of-the-next-eight contests. On June 31, 1994, he was waived in a salary cap move.

Detroit Lions
On July 15, 1994, he was signed as a free agent by the Detroit Lions. He finished with 85 tackles (fourth on the team) and 7 sacks (led the team).

Minnesota Vikings
On March 9, 1995, he signed as a free agent with the Minnesota Vikings. He recorded 86 tackles (second on the team), 6 sacks, 6 tackles for loss and 7 passes defensed. He was released on February 9, 1996, after being charged with possession of an unauthorized hand gun and with drunken driving.

Dallas Cowboys
On March 22, 1996, he was signed by the Dallas Cowboys as a free agent, to replace Dixon Edwards, who in turn signed with the Vikings to replace Thomas. In the last 6 games he was moved to defensive end after Charles Haley had season-ending back surgery, finishing with 65 tackles, 4.5 sacks (tied for second on the team), 5 tackles for loss, 20 quarterback pressures (tied for third on the team), 4 passes defensed and 3 fumble recoveries (led the team). 

In 1997, he was a backup defensive end, registering 31 tackles, 3.5 sacks (fourth on the team) and 10 quarterback pressures (led the team). The next year, he was placed on the injured reserve list after tearing ligaments in his left knee during a Sunday training camp practice. He wasn't re-signed after the season, finishing his career with a streak of 144 consecutive games played.

Personal life 
Thomas is married to Yvonne Thomas 2000- and is the nephew of former Chicago Bears linebacker, and former San Francisco 49ers head coach Mike Singletary. His son, Broderick Jr., also attended Madison High School in Houston, where he played quarterback. Son Elijah plays basketball and football. He resides in Missouri City, Texas.

References

External links 
 Nebraska Cornhuskers bio
 Life after the NFL is all pain, no fame for Broderick Thomas

1967 births
Living people
Players of American football from Houston
American football defensive ends
American football linebackers
Nebraska Cornhuskers football players
Tampa Bay Buccaneers players
Detroit Lions players
Minnesota Vikings players
Dallas Cowboys players
All-American college football players